According to the Book of Mormon, Ether is a Jaredite prophet, one of the last surviving Jaredites, and primary author of the Book of Ether.

Lineage

Life
Ether's grandfather Moron had been king of the Jaredites. Moron was overthrown and "dwelt in captivity all the remainder of his days". Ether's father, Coriantor, was born while his father was captive and Coriantor "dwelt in captivity all his days". Ether "was a prophet of the Lord" and "lived in the days of Coriantumr; and Coriantumr was king over all the land". The people rejected his teachings concerning a "New Jerusalem", causing him to hide in a cave, where he witnessed the destruction of the Jaredites. Ether was compelled to preach to Coriantumr, who also rejected his word. After sealing up the records, Ether's final words were, "Whether the Lord will that I be translated, or that I suffer the will of the Lord in the flesh, it mattereth not, if it so be that I am saved in the kingdom of God. Amen."

Praise
Monte J. Brough said the following about him: "Ether, as my personal mentor of some years, has helped me understand how hope, which 'cometh of faith, maketh an anchor' to my soul. It is this hope for a better world that is the foundation of the great plan of happiness. This profound hope...is part of the process of bringing stability into our lives."

"In facing tragedy, it is instructional to observe those who have complete and total faith in the reality of the mansions of our Father. This faith does result in a testimony of Jesus Christ and the process of the Atonement. 'Man must hope, or he cannot receive' the blessing of the great plan of happiness, which provides peace and understanding for mortal mankind. It is this 'more excellent hope' that allows us to accept whatever trial or test comes to us. As each of us faces personal tragedy, we can have a much better acceptance of the final results because of the prophet Ether's example."

Teachings

Polygamy
According to Daniel H. Ludlow, it is not clear, however, whether or not the Jaredites were commanded by the Lord to practice polygamy. The following evidences have been cited which might indicate that they did practice polygamy:
 Many of the men had large numbers of sons and daughters. For example, the brother of Jared had 22 sons and daughters and Orihah had 31 sons and daughters.
 Riplakish had "many wives and concubines". He was condemned by the Lord for his wickedness, but it is not clear whether or not this condemnation was because of his "many wives."
 In  it states that "every man kept the hilt of his sword in his right hand, in the defence of his property and his own life and of his wives and children." This verse seems to indicate that the people practiced polygamy, but whether or not it was sanctioned by the Lord is not made clear in the record.

Cycle of Righteousness

 shows a pattern repeated many times in the Book of Mormon:
 During the righteous reigns of Emer and Coriantum the people prospered exceedingly (v. 15-25)
 Under the reign of Heth, the people began to join together in secret combinations, and they turned to wickedness (v. 26-27)
 The Lord sent prophets to warn the people of their terrible circumstances (v. 28)
 The people of Heth rejected the prophets (v. 29)
 The judgments of God fell upon the people (v. 30-33)
 The people humbled themselves and repented and the Lord blessed them again with prosperity (v. 34-35)

The Jaredites were able to be wealthy and remain righteous for more than 100 years (see v. 15-25).

Secret Combinations

In  we learn four important things concerning secret combinations:
 Secret combinations are wicked and forbidden of the Lord (v. 18-19)
 Secret combinations are "had among all people" (v. 20)
 Secret combinations "caused the destruction" of both the Jaredite and Nephite nations (v. 21)
 Whatever nation upholds secret combinations "shall be destroyed" (v. 22)

New Jerusalem
In  we learn about a New Jerusalem:
 It will be "the holy sanctuary of the Lord"
 It will be built on the American continent for the remnant of the seed of Joseph (v. 4–6)
 It will be a holy city like the Jerusalem built unto the Lord (v. 8–9)
 It will stand until the earth is celestialized (v. 8)
 It will be a city for the pure and righteous (v. 10)

Comparison with Moroni
The last prophet called of God to warn the Jaredite nation and to witness against them was Ether, the son of Coriantor. H. Donl Peterson notes that Moroni could have empathized with Ether, since both were prophets of God sent to preach to a people who were "past feeling" and who "did reject all the words of the prophets". Both men were the last of their once great civilizations, and both were called upon to record their final struggles and then were charged to be responsible for preserving the precious records of their fallen people.

See also

 List of Book of Mormon prophets
 Mahonri Moriancumer, the brother of Jared

References

Further reading

External links

 Ethers Cave image by Walter Rane

Book of Mormon prophets